Richard Fairhurst (born 5 September 1911, date of death unknown) was an English professional association footballer who played as a full back.

References

1911 births
Year of death missing
Association football defenders
Burnley F.C. players
English Football League players
English footballers
Footballers from St Helens, Merseyside
Hartlepool United F.C. players
Skelmersdale United F.C. players
Tranmere Rovers F.C. players